Bird Beers Chapman (August 24, 1821 – September 21, 1871) was an American politician and lawyer from the Nebraska Territory; born in Salisbury, Connecticut, August 24, 1821; attended the public schools; studied law; was admitted to the bar and commenced practice in Elyria, Lorain County, Ohio; moved to the Territory of Nebraska and settled in Omaha, Nebraska; was editor of the Omaha Nebraskan 1855-1859; elected as a Democrat to the Thirty-fourth Congress (March 4, 1855 – March 3, 1857); unsuccessfully contested the election of Fenner Ferguson to the Thirty-fifth Congress; died at Put in Bay, Ottawa County, Ohio, September 21, 1871; interment in Ridgelawn Cemetery, Elyria, Ohio.

Sources

1821 births
1871 deaths
19th-century American politicians
Delegates to the United States House of Representatives from Nebraska Territory
Nebraska Democrats
People from Salisbury, Connecticut